A mosque or masjid (both from ,) is a place of prayer for Muslims. Mosques are usually covered buildings, but can be any place where prayers (sujud) are performed, including outdoor courtyards.

The first mosques were simple places of prayer for Muslims, and may have been open spaces rather than buildings. In the first stage of Islamic architecture, 650-750 CE, early mosques comprised open and closed covered spaces enclosed by walls, often with minarets from which calls to prayer were issued. Mosque buildings typically contain an ornamental niche (mihrab) set into the wall that indicates the direction of Mecca (qiblah) and ablution facilities. The pulpit (minbar), from which the Friday (jumu'ah) sermon (khutba) is delivered, was in earlier times characteristic of the central city mosque, but has since become common in smaller mosques. Mosques typically have segregated spaces for men and women. This basic pattern of organization has assumed different forms depending on the region, period and denomination.

Mosques commonly serve as locations for prayer, Ramadan vigils, funeral services, marriage and business agreements, alms collection and distribution, as well as homeless shelters. Historically, mosques have served as a community center, a court of law, and a religious school. In modern times, they have also preserved their role as places of religious instruction and debate. Special importance is accorded to the Great Mosque of Mecca (centre of the hajj), the Prophet's Mosque in Medina (burial place of Muhammad) and Al-Aqsa Mosque in Jerusalem (believed to be the site of Muhammad's ascent to heaven).

With the spread of Islam, mosques multiplied across the Islamic world. Sometimes churches and temples were converted into mosques, which influenced Islamic architectural styles.  While most pre-modern mosques were funded by charitable endowments, increasing government regulation of large mosques has been countered by a rise of privately funded mosques, many of which serve as bases for different Islamic revivalist currents and social activism. Mosques have played a number of political roles. The rates of mosque attendance vary widely depending on the region.

Etymology

History

Origins

According to Islamic scholars and history, Islam was established in Arabia during the lifetime of Muhammad in the 7th century CE, and so did architectural components such as the mosque. In this case, either the Mosque of the Companions in the Eritrean city of Massawa, or the Quba Mosque in the Hejazi city of Medina (the first structure built by Muhammad upon his emigration from Mecca in 622 CE), would be the first mosque that was built in the history of Islam.

Other scholars reference Islamic tradition and passages of the Quran, according to which Islam as a religion precedes Muhammad, and includes previous prophets such as Abraham. In Islamic tradition, Abraham is credited with having built the Ka'bah ('Cube') in Mecca, and consequently its sanctuary, Al-Masjid Al-Haram (The Sacred Mosque), which is seen by Muslims as the first mosque that existed. A Hadith in Sahih al-Bukhari states that the sanctuary of the Kaaba was the first mosque on Earth, with the second mosque being Al-Aqsa Mosque in Jerusalem, which is also associated with Abraham. Since as early as 638 CE, the Sacred Mosque of Mecca has been expanded on several occasions to accommodate the increasing number of Muslims who either live in the area or make the annual pilgrimage known as Hajj to the city.

Either way, after the Quba Mosque, Muhammad went on to establish another mosque in Medina, which is now known as Al-Masjid an-Nabawi (The Prophet's Mosque). Built on the site of his home, Muhammad participated in the construction of the mosque himself and helped pioneer the concept of the mosque as the focal point of the Islamic city. The Prophet's mosque introduced some of the features still common in today's mosques, including the niche at the front of the prayer space known as the mihrab and the tiered pulpit called the minbar. The mosque was also constructed with a large courtyard, a motif common among mosques built since then.

Diffusion and evolution

The Great Mosque of Kairouan in present-day Tunisia was the first mosque built in northwest Africa, with its present form (dating from the ninth century) serving as a model for other Islamic places of worship in the Maghreb. It was the first to incorporate a square minaret (as opposed to the more common circular minaret) and includes naves akin to a basilica. Those features can also be found in Andalusian mosques, including the Grand Mosque of Cordoba, as they tended to reflect the architecture of the Moors instead of their Visigoth predecessors. Still, some elements of Visigothic architecture, like horseshoe arches, were infused into the mosque architecture of Spain and the Maghreb.

The first mosque in East Asia was established in the eighth century in Xi'an. The Great Mosque of Xi'an, whose current building dates from the 18th century, does not replicate the features often associated with mosques elsewhere. Minarets were initially prohibited by the state. Following traditional Chinese architecture, the Great Mosque of Xi'an, like many other mosques in eastern China, resembles a pagoda, with a green roof instead of the yellow roof common on imperial structures in China. Mosques in western China were more likely to incorporate elements, like domes and minarets, traditionally seen in mosques elsewhere.

A similar integration of foreign and local influences could be seen on the Indonesian islands of Sumatra and Java, where mosques, including the Demak Great Mosque, were first established in the 15th century. Early Javanese mosques took design cues from Hindu, Buddhist, and Chinese architectural influences, with tall timber, multi-level roofs similar to the pagodas of Balinese Hindu temples; the ubiquitous Islamic dome did not appear in Indonesia until the 19th century. In turn, the Javanese style influenced the styles of mosques in Indonesia's Austronesian neighbors—Malaysia, Brunei, and the Philippines.

Muslim empires were instrumental in the evolution and spread of mosques. Although mosques were first established in India during the seventh century, they were not commonplace across the subcontinent until the arrival of the Mughals in the 16th and 17th centuries. Reflecting their Timurid origins, Mughal-style mosques included onion domes, pointed arches, and elaborate circular minarets, features common in the Persian and Central Asian styles. The Jama Masjid in Delhi and the Badshahi Mosque in Lahore, built in a similar manner in the mid-17th century, remain two of the largest mosques on the Indian subcontinent.

The Umayyad Caliphate was particularly instrumental in spreading Islam and establishing mosques within the Levant, as the Umayyads constructed among the most revered mosques in the region — Al-Aqsa Mosque and Dome of the Rock in Jerusalem, and the Umayyad Mosque in Damascus. The designs of the Dome of the Rock and the Umayyad Mosque were influenced by Byzantine architecture, a trend that continued with the rise of the Ottoman Empire.

Several of the early mosques in the Ottoman Empire were originally churches or cathedrals from the Byzantine Empire, with the Hagia Sophia (one of those converted cathedrals) informing the architecture of mosques from after the Ottoman conquest of Constantinople. Still, the Ottomans developed their own architectural style characterized by large central rotundas (sometimes surrounded by multiple smaller domes), pencil-shaped minarets, and open facades.

Mosques from the Ottoman period are still scattered across Eastern Europe, but the most rapid growth in the number of mosques in Europe has occurred within the past century as more Muslims have migrated to the continent. Many major European cities are home to mosques, like the Grand Mosque of Paris, that incorporate domes, minarets, and other features often found with mosques in Muslim-majority countries. The first mosque in North America was founded by Albanian Americans in 1915, but the continent's oldest surviving mosque, the Mother Mosque of America, was built in 1934. As in Europe, the number of American mosques has rapidly increased in recent decades as Muslim immigrants, particularly from South Asia, have come in the United States. Greater than forty percent of mosques in the United States were constructed after 2000.

Inter-religious conversion

According to early Muslim historians, towns that surrendered without resistance and made treaties with the Muslims were allowed to retain their churches and the towns captured by Muslims had many of their churches converted to mosques. One of the earliest examples of these kinds of conversions was in Damascus, Syria, where in 705 Umayyad caliph Al-Walid I bought the church of St. John from the Christians and had it rebuilt as a mosque in exchange for building a number of new churches for the Christians in Damascus. Overall, Abd al-Malik ibn Marwan (Al-Waleed's father) is said to have transformed 10 churches in Damascus into mosques.

The process of turning churches into mosques were especially intensive in the villages where most of the inhabitants converted to Islam. The Abbasid caliph al-Ma'mun turned many churches into mosques. Ottoman Turks converted nearly all churches, monasteries, and chapels in Constantinople, including the famous Hagia Sophia, into mosques immediately after capturing the city in 1453. In some instances mosques have been established on the places of Jewish or Christian sanctuaries associated with Biblical personalities who were also recognized by Islam.

Mosques have also been converted for use by other religions, notably in southern Spain, following the conquest of the Moors in 1492. The most prominent of them is the Great Mosque of Cordoba, itself constructed on the site of a church demolished during the period of Muslim rule. Outside of the Iberian Peninsula, such instances also occurred in southeastern Europe once regions were no longer under Muslim rule.

Religious functions

The masjid jāmiʿ, a central mosque, can play a role in religious activities such as teaching the Quran and educating future imams.

Prayers
There are two holidays (Eids) in the Islamic calendar: ʿĪd al-Fiṭr and ʿĪd al-Aḍḥā, during which there are special prayers held at mosques in the morning. These Eid prayers are supposed to be offered in large groups, and so, in the absence of an outdoor Eidgah, a large mosque will normally host them for their congregants as well as the congregants of smaller local mosques. Some mosques will even rent convention centers or other large public buildings to hold the large number of Muslims who attend. Mosques, especially those in countries where Muslims are the majority, will also host Eid prayers outside in courtyards, town squares or on the outskirts of town in an Eidgah.

Ramadan

Islam's holiest month, Ramaḍān, is observed through many events. As Muslims must fast during the day during Ramadan, mosques will host Ifṭār dinners after sunset and the fourth required prayer of the day, that is Maghrib. Food is provided, at least in part, by members of the community, thereby creating daily potluck dinners. Because of the community contribution necessary to serve iftar dinners, mosques with smaller congregations may not be able to host the iftar dinners daily. Some mosques will also hold Suḥūr meals before dawn to congregants attending the first required prayer of the day, Fajr. As with iftar dinners, congregants usually provide the food for suhoor, although able mosques may provide food instead. Mosques will often invite poorer members of the Muslim community to share in beginning and breaking the fasts, as providing charity during Ramadan is regarded in Islam as especially honorable.

Following the last obligatory daily prayer (ʿIshāʾ) special, optional Tarāwīḥ prayers are offered in larger mosques. During each night of prayers, which can last for up to two hours each night, usually one member of the community who has memorized the entire Quran (a Hafiz) will recite a segment of the book. Sometimes, several such people (not necessarily of the local community) take turns to do this. During the last ten days of Ramadan, larger mosques will host all-night programs to observe Laylat al-Qadr, the night Muslims believe that Muhammad first received Quranic revelations. On that night, between sunset and sunrise, mosques employ speakers to educate congregants in attendance about Islam. Mosques or the community usually provide meals periodically throughout the night

During the last ten days of Ramadan, larger mosques within the Muslim community will host Iʿtikāf, a practice in which at least one Muslim man from the community must participate. Muslims performing itikaf are required to stay within the mosque for ten consecutive days, often in worship or learning about Islam. As a result, the rest of the Muslim community is responsible for providing the participants with food, drinks, and whatever else they need during their stay.

Charity

The third of the Five Pillars of Islam states that Muslims are required to give approximately one-fortieth of their wealth to charity as Zakat. Since mosques form the center of Muslim communities, they are where Muslims go to both give zakat and, if necessary, collect it. Before the holiday of Eid ul-Fitr, mosques also collect a special zakat that is supposed to assist in helping poor Muslims attend the prayers and celebrations associated with the holiday.

Frequency of attendance

The frequency by which Muslims attend mosque services vary greatly around the world. In some countries, weekly attendance at religious services are common among Muslims while in others, attendance is rare. A study of American Muslims did not find differences in mosque attendance by gender or age.

Architecture

Styles

Arab-plan or hypostyle mosques are the earliest type of mosques, pioneered under the Umayyad Dynasty. These mosques have square or rectangular plans with an enclosed courtyard (sahn) and covered prayer hall. Historically, in the warm Middle Eastern and Mediterranean climates, the courtyard served to accommodate the large number of worshippers during Friday prayers. Most early hypostyle mosques had flat roofs on prayer halls, which required the use of numerous columns and supports. One of the most notable hypostyle mosques is the Great Mosque of Cordoba in Spain, the building being supported by over 850 columns. Frequently, hypostyle mosques have outer arcades (riwaq) so that visitors can enjoy the shade. Arab-plan mosques were constructed mostly under the Umayyad and Abbasid dynasties. The simplicity of the Arab plan limited the opportunities for further development, the mosques consequently losing popularity.

The first departure within mosque design started in Persia (Iran). The Persians had inherited a rich architectural legacy from the earlier Persian dynasties, and they began incorporating elements from earlier Parthian and Sassanid designs into their mosques, influenced by buildings such as the Palace of Ardashir and the Sarvestan Palace. Thus, Islamic architecture witnessed the introduction of such structures as domes and large, arched entrances, referred to as iwans. During Seljuq rule, as Islamic mysticism was on the rise, the four-iwan arrangement took form. The four-iwan format, finalized by the Seljuqs, and later inherited by the Safavids, firmly established the courtyard façade of such mosques, with the towering gateways at every side, as more important than the actual buildings themselves. They typically took the form of a square-shaped central courtyard with large entrances at each side, giving the impression of gateways to the spiritual world. The Persians also introduced Persian gardens into mosque designs. Soon, a distinctly Persian style of mosques started appearing that would significantly influence the designs of later Timurid, and also Mughal, mosque designs.

The Ottomans introduced central dome mosques in the 15th century. These mosques have a large dome centered over the prayer hall. In addition to having a large central dome, a common feature is smaller domes that exist off-center over the prayer hall or throughout the rest of the mosque, where prayer is not performed. This style was heavily influenced by Byzantine architecture with its use of large central domes.

Mosques built in Southeast Asia often represent the Indonesian-Javanese style architecture, which are different from the ones found throughout the Greater Middle East. The ones found in Europe and North America appear to have various styles but most are built on Western architectural designs, some are former churches or other buildings that were used by non-Muslims. In Africa, most mosques are old but the new ones are built in imitation of those of the Middle East. This can be seen in the Abuja National Mosque in Nigeria and others.

Islam forbids figurative art, on the grounds that the artist must not imitate God's creation. Mosques are, therefore, decorated with abstract patterns and beautiful inscriptions. Decoration is often concentrated around doorways and the miḥrāb. Tiles are used widely in mosques. They lend themselves to pattern-making, can be made with beautiful subtle colors, and can create a cool atmosphere, an advantage in the hot Arab countries. Quotations from the Quran often adorn mosque interiors. These texts are meant to inspire people by their beauty, while also reminding them of the words of Allah.

Prayer hall
The prayer hall, also known as the muṣallá, rarely has furniture; chairs and pews are generally absent from the prayer hall so as to allow as many worshipers as possible to line the room. Some mosques have Islamic calligraphy and Quranic verses on the walls to assist worshippers in focusing on the beauty of Islam and its holiest book, the Quran, as well as for decoration.

Often, a limited part of the prayer hall is sanctified formally as a masjid in the sharia sense (although the term masjid is also used for the larger mosque complex as well). Once designated, there are onerous limitations on the use of this formally designated masjid, and it may not be used for any purpose other than worship; restrictions that do not necessarily apply to the rest of the prayer area, and to the rest of the mosque complex (although such uses may be restricted by the conditions of the waqf that owns the mosque).

In many mosques, especially the early congregational mosques, the prayer hall is in the hypostyle form (the roof held up by a multitude of columns). One of the finest examples of the hypostyle-plan mosques is the Great Mosque of Kairouan (also known as the Mosque of Uqba) in Tunisia.

Usually opposite the entrance to the prayer hall is the qiblah wall, the visually emphasized area inside the prayer hall. The qiblah wall should, in a properly oriented mosque, be set perpendicular to a line leading to Mecca, the location of the Kaaba. Congregants pray in rows parallel to the qiblah wall and thus arrange themselves so they face Mecca. In the qiblah wall, usually at its center, is the mihrab, a niche or depression indicating the direction of Mecca. Usually the mihrab is not occupied by furniture either. A raised minbar or pulpit is located to the right side of the mihrab for a Khaṭīb, or some other speaker, to offer a Khuṭbah (Sermon) during Friday prayers. The mihrab serves as the location where the imam leads the five daily prayers on a regular basis.

Left to the mihrab, in the front left corner of the mosque, sometimes there is a kursu (Turkish , Bosnian ), a small elevated plateau (rarely with a chair or other type of seat) used for less formal preaching and speeches.

Makhphil

Women who pray in mosques are separated from men there. Their part for prayer is called makhphil or maqfil (Bosnian ). It is located above the main prayer hall, elevated in the background as stairs-separated gallery or plateau (surface-shortened to the back relative to the bottom main part). It usually has a perforated fence at the front, through which imam (and male prayers in the main hall) can be partially seen. Makhphil is completely used by men when Jumu'ah is practised (due to lack of space).

Mihrab

A miḥrāb, also spelled as mehrab is a semicircular niche in the wall of a mosque that faces the qiblah (i.e. the "front" of the mosque); the imam stands in this niche and leads prayer. Given that the imam typically stands alone in the frontmost row, this niche's practical effect is to save unused space. The minbar is a pulpit from which the Friday sermon is delivered. While the minbar of Muhammad was a simple chair, later it became larger and attracted artistic attention. Some remained made of wood, albeit exquisitely carved, while others were made of marble and featured friezes.

Minarets

A common feature in mosques is the minaret, the tall, slender tower that usually is situated at one of the corners of the mosque structure. The top of the minaret is always the highest point in mosques that have one, and often the highest point in the immediate area. The origin of the minaret and its initial functions are not clearly known and have long been a topic of scholarly discussion. The earliest mosques lacked minarets, and the call to prayer was often performed from smaller structures or elevated platforms. The early Muslim community of Medina gave the call to prayer from the doorway or the roof of the house of Muhammad, which doubled as a place for prayer. The first confirmed minarets in the form of towers date from the early 9th century under Abbasid rule and they did not become a standard feature of mosques until the 11th century. These first minaret towers were placed in the middle of the wall opposite the qibla wall. Among them, the minaret of the Great Mosque of Kairouan in Tunisia, dating from 836, is well-preserved and is one of the oldest surviving minarets in the world today.

Before the five required daily prayers, a Mu’adhdhin calls the worshippers to prayer from the minaret. In many countries like Singapore where Muslims are not the majority, mosques are prohibited from loudly broadcasting the Adhān (Call to Prayer), although it is supposed to be said loudly to the surrounding community. The adhan is required before every prayer. Nearly every mosque assigns a muezzin for each prayer to say the adhan as it is a recommended practice or Sunnah of the Islamic prophet Muhammad. At mosques that do not have minarets, the adhan is called instead from inside the mosque or somewhere else on the ground. The Iqâmah, which is similar to the adhan and proclaimed right before the commencement of prayers, is usually not proclaimed from the minaret even if a mosque has one.

Domes

The domes, often placed directly above the main prayer hall, may signify the vaults of the heaven and sky. As time progressed, domes grew, from occupying a small part of the roof near the mihrab to encompassing the whole roof above the prayer hall. Although domes normally took on the shape of a hemisphere, the Mughals in India popularized onion-shaped domes in South Asia which has gone on to become characteristic of the Arabic architectural style of dome. Some mosques have multiple, often smaller, domes in addition to the main large dome that resides at the center. The domes of Turkish-style mosques are influenced by Byzantine architecture, particularly from the 15th century onwards as the Balkans and Constantinople became part of the Ottoman Empire.

Ablution facilities

As ritual purification precedes all prayers, mosques often have ablution fountains or other facilities for washing in their entryways or courtyards. Worshippers at much smaller mosques often have to use restrooms to perform their ablutions. In traditional mosques, this function is often elaborated into a freestanding building in the center of a courtyard. This desire for cleanliness extends to the prayer halls where shoes are disallowed to be worn anywhere other than the cloakroom. Thus, foyers with shelves to put shoes and racks to hold coats are commonplace among mosques.

Contemporary features
Modern mosques have a variety of amenities available to their congregants. As mosques are supposed to appeal to the community, they may also have additional facilities, from health clinics and clubs (gyms) to libraries to gymnasiums, to serve the community.

Symbols
Certain symbols are represented in a mosque's architecture to allude to different aspects of the Islamic religion. One of these feature symbols is the spiral. The "cosmic spiral" found in designs and on minarets is a references to heaven as it has "no beginning and no end". Mosques also often have floral patterns or images of fruit and vegetables. These are allusions to the paradise after death.

Rules and etiquette

Prayer leading

Appointment of a prayer leader is considered desirable, but not always obligatory. The permanent prayer leader (imam) must be a free honest individual and is authoritative in religious matters. In mosques constructed and maintained by the government, the prayer leader is appointed by the ruler; in private mosques, appointment is made by members of the congregation through majority voting. According to the Hanafi school of Islamic jurisprudence, the individual who built the mosque has a stronger claim to the title of imam, but this view is not shared by the other schools.

Leadership at prayer falls into three categories, depending on the type of prayer: five daily prayers, Friday prayer, or optional prayers. According to the Hanafi and Maliki school of Islamic jurisprudence, appointment of a prayer leader for Friday service is mandatory because otherwise the prayer is invalid. The Shafi'i and Hanbali schools argue that the appointment is not necessary and the prayer is valid as long as it is performed in a congregation. A slave may lead a Friday prayer, but Muslim authorities disagree over whether the job can be done by a minor. An imam appointed to lead Friday prayers may also lead at the five daily prayers; Muslim scholars agree to the leader appointed for five daily services may lead the Friday service as well.

All Muslim authorities hold the consensus opinion that only men may lead prayer for men. Nevertheless, women prayer leaders are allowed to lead prayer in front of all-female congregations.

Cleanliness

All mosques have rules regarding cleanliness, as it is an essential part of the worshippers' experience. Muslims before prayer are required to cleanse themselves in an ablution process known as wudu. Shoes must not be worn inside the carpeted prayer hall. Some mosques will also extend that rule to include other parts of the facility even if those other locations are not devoted to prayer. Congregants and visitors to mosques are supposed to be clean themselves. It is also undesirable to come to the mosque after eating something that smells, such as garlic.

Dress
Islam requires that its adherents wear clothes that portray modesty. Men are supposed to come to the mosque wearing loose and clean clothes that do not reveal the shape of the body. Likewise, it is recommended that women at a mosque wear loose clothing that covers to the wrists and ankles, and cover their heads with a Ḥijāb, or other covering. Many Muslims, regardless of their ethnic background, wear Middle Eastern clothing associated with Arabic Islam to special occasions and prayers at mosques.

Concentration
As mosques are places of worship, those within the mosque are required to remain respectful to those in prayer. Loud talking within the mosque, as well as discussion of topics deemed disrespectful, is forbidden in areas where people are praying. In addition, it is disrespectful to walk in front of or otherwise disturb Muslims in prayer. The walls within the mosque have few items, except for possibly Islamic calligraphy, so Muslims in prayer are not distracted. Muslims are also discouraged from wearing clothing with distracting images and symbols so as not to divert the attention of those standing behind them during prayer. In many mosques, even the carpeted prayer area has no designs, its plainness helping worshippers to focus.

Gender separation

There is nothing written in the Qur'an about the issue of space in mosques and gender separation. Traditional rules have segregated women and men. By traditional rules, women are most often told to occupy the rows behind the men. In part, this was a practical matter as the traditional posture for prayerkneeling on the floor, head to the groundmade mixed-gender prayer uncomfortably revealing for many women and distracting for some men. Traditionalists try to argue that Muhammad preferred women to pray at home rather than at a mosque, and they cite a ḥadīth in which Muhammad supposedly said: "The best mosques for women are the inner parts of their houses," although women were active participants in the mosque started by Muhammad. Muhammad told Muslims not to forbid women from entering mosques. They are allowed to go in. The second Sunni caliph 'Umar at one time prohibited women from attending mosques especially at night because he feared they might be sexually harassed or assaulted by men, so he required them to pray at home. Sometimes a special part of the mosque was railed off for women; for example, the governor of Mecca in 870 had ropes tied between the columns to make a separate place for women.

Many mosques today will put the women behind a barrier or partition or in another room. Mosques in South and Southeast Asia put men and women in separate rooms, as the divisions were built into them centuries ago. In nearly two-thirds of American mosques, women pray behind partitions or in separate areas, not in the main prayer hall; some mosques do not admit women at all due to the lack of space and the fact that some prayers, such as the Friday Jumuʻah, are mandatory for men but optional for women. Although there are sections exclusively for women and children, the Grand Mosque in Mecca is desegregated.

Non-Muslim inclusion

Under most interpretations of sharia, non-Muslims are permitted to enter mosques provided that they respect the place and the people inside it. A dissenting opinion and minority view is presented by followers of the Maliki school of Islamic jurisprudence, who argue that non-Muslims may not be allowed into mosques under any circumstances.

The Quran addresses the subject of non-Muslims, and particularly polytheists, in mosques in two verses in its ninth chapter, Sura At-Tawba. The seventeenth verse of the chapter prohibits those who join gods with Allah—polytheists—from maintaining mosques:

The twenty-eighth verse of the same chapter is more specific as it only considers polytheists in the Masjid al-Haram in Mecca:

According to Ahmad ibn Hanbal, these verses were followed to the letter at the times of Muhammad, when Jews and Christians, considered monotheists, were still allowed to Al-Masjid Al-Haram. The Umayyad caliph Umar II later forbade non-Muslims from entering mosques, and his ruling remains in practice in present-day Saudi Arabia. Today, the decision on whether non-Muslims should be allowed to enter mosques varies. With few exceptions, mosques in the Arabian Peninsula as well as Morocco do not allow entry to non-Muslims. For example, the Hassan II Mosque in Casablanca is one of only two mosques in Morocco currently open to non-Muslims.

There are many other mosques in the West and Islamic world which non-Muslims are welcome to enter. Most mosques in the United States, for example, report receiving non-Muslim visitors every month. Many mosques throughout the United States welcome non-Muslims as a sign of openness to the rest of the community as well as to encourage conversions to Islam.

In modern-day Saudi Arabia, the Grand Mosque and all of Mecca are open only to Muslims. Likewise, Al-Masjid Al-Nabawi and the city of Medina that surrounds it are also off-limits to those who do not practice Islam. For mosques in other areas, it has most commonly been taken that non-Muslims may only enter mosques if granted permission to do so by Muslims, and if they have a legitimate reason. All entrants regardless of religious affiliation are expected to respect the rules and decorum for mosques.

In modern Turkey, non-Muslim tourists are allowed to enter any mosque, but there are some strict rules. Visiting a mosque is allowed only between prayers; visitors are required to wear long trousers and not to wear shoes, women must cover their heads; visitors are not allowed to interrupt praying Muslims, especially by taking photos of them; no loud talk is allowed; and no references to other religions are allowed (no crosses on necklaces, no cross gestures, etc.) Similar rules apply to mosques in Malaysia, where larger mosques that are also tourist attractions (such as the Masjid Negara) provide robes and headscarves for visitors who are deemed inappropriately attired.

In certain times and places, non-Muslims were expected to behave a certain way in the vicinity of a mosque: in some Moroccan cities, Jews were required to remove their shoes when passing by a mosque; in 18th-century Egypt, Jews and Christians had to dismount before several mosques in veneration of their sanctity.

The association of the mosque with education remained one of its main characteristics throughout history, and the school became an indispensable appendage to the mosque. From the earliest days of Islam, the mosque was the center of the Muslim community, a place for prayer, meditation, religious instruction, political discussion, and a school. Anywhere Islam took hold, mosques were established, and basic religious and educational instruction began.

Role in contemporary society

Political mobilization

The late 20th century saw an increase in the number of mosques used for political purposes. While some governments in the Muslim world have attempted to limit the content of Friday sermons to strictly religious topics, there are also independent preachers who deliver khutbas that address social and political issues, often in emotionally charged terms. Common themes include social inequalities, necessity of jihad in the face of injustice, and the universal struggle between good and evil. In Islamic countries like Bangladesh, Pakistan, Iran, and Saudi Arabia, political subjects are preached by imams at Friday congregations on a regular basis. Mosques often serve as meeting points for political opposition in times of crisis.

Countries with a minority Muslim population are more likely than Muslim-majority countries of the Greater Middle East to use mosques as a way to promote civic participation. Studies of US Muslims have consistently shown a positive correlation between mosque attendance and political involvement. Some of the research connects civic engagement specifically with mosque attendance for social and religious activities other than prayer.  American mosques host voter registration and civic participation drives that promote involving Muslims, who are often first- or second-generation immigrants, in the political process. As a result of these efforts as well as attempts at mosques to keep Muslims informed about the issues facing the Muslim community, regular mosque attendants are more likely to participate in protests, sign petitions, and otherwise be involved in politics. Research on Muslim civic engagement in other Western countries "is less conclusive but seems to indicate similar trends".

Role in violent conflicts

As they are considered important to the Muslim community, mosques, like other places of worship, can be at the heart of social conflicts. The Babri Mosque in India was the subject of such a conflict up until the early 1990s when it was demolished. Before a mutual solution could be devised, the mosque was destroyed on December 6, 1992, as the mosque was built by Babur allegedly on the site of a previous Hindu temple marking the birthplace of Rama. The controversy surrounded the mosque was directly linked to rioting in Bombay (present-day Mumbai) as well as bombings in 1993 that killed 257 people.

Bombings in February 2006 and June 2007 seriously damaged Iraq's al-Askari Mosque and exacerbated existing tensions. Other mosque bombings in Iraq, both before and after the February 2006 bombing, have been part of the conflict between the country's groups of Muslims. In June 2005, a suicide bombing killed at least 19 people at an Afghan Shia mosque near Jade Maivand. In April 2006, two explosions occurred at India's Jama Masjid. Following the al-Askari Mosque bombing in Iraq, imams and other Islamic leaders used mosques and Friday prayers as vehicles to call for calm and peace in the midst of widespread violence.

A study 2005 indicated that while support for suicide bombings is not correlated with personal devotion to Islam among Palestinian Muslims, it is correlated with mosque attendance because "participating in communal religious rituals of any kind likely encourages support for self-sacrificing behaviors that are done for the collective good."

Following the September 11 attacks, several American mosques were targeted in attacks ranging from simple vandalism to arson. Furthermore, the Jewish Defense League was suspected of plotting to bomb the King Fahd Mosque in Culver City, California. Similar attacks occurred throughout the United Kingdom following the 7 July 2005 London bombings. Outside the Western world, in June 2001, the Hassan Bek Mosque was the target of vandalism and attacks by hundreds of Israelis after a suicide bomber killed 19 people in a night club in Tel Aviv. Although mosquegoing is highly encouraged for men, it is permitted to stay at home when one feels at risk from Islamophobic persecution.

Saudi influence
Although the Saudi involvement in Sunni mosques around the world can be traced back to the 1960s, it was not until later in the 20th century that the government of Saudi Arabia became a large influence in foreign Sunni mosques. Beginning in the 1980s, the Saudi Arabian government began to finance the construction of Sunni mosques in countries around the world. An estimated US$45 billion has been spent by the Saudi Arabian government financing mosques and Sunni Islamic schools in foreign countries. Ain al-Yaqeen, a Saudi newspaper, reported in 2002 that Saudi funds may have contributed to building as many as 1,500 mosques and 2,000 other Islamic centers.

Saudi citizens have also contributed significantly to mosques in the Islamic world, especially in countries where they see Muslims as poor and oppressed. Following the fall of the Soviet Union, in 1992, mosques in war-torn Afghanistan saw many contributions from Saudi citizens. The King Fahd Mosque in Culver City, California and the Islamic Cultural Center of Italy in Rome represent two of Saudi Arabia's largest investments in foreign mosques as former Saudi king Fahd bin Abdul Aziz al-Saud contributed US$8 million and US$50 million to the two mosques, respectively.

Political controversy 
 
In the western world, and in the United States in particular, anti-Muslim sentiment and targeted domestic policy has created challenges for mosques and those looking to build them. There has been government and police surveillance of mosques in the US and local attempts to ban mosques and block constructions, despite data showing that in fact, most Americans opposing banning the building of mosques (79%) and the surveillance of U.S. mosques (63%) as shown in a 2018 study done by the Institute for Social Policy and Understanding.

Since 2017, Chinese authorities have destroyed or damaged two-thirds of the mosques in China's Xinjiang province. Ningxia officials were notified on 3 August 2018 that the Weizhou Grand Mosque would be forcibly demolished because it had not received the proper permits before construction. Officials in the town said that the mosque had not been given proper building permits, because it is built in a Middle Eastern style and includes numerous domes and minarets.  The residents of Weizhou alarmed each other through social media and finally stopped the mosque destruction by public demonstrations.

See also
 Holiest sites in Islam
 Jama'at Khana
 Lists of mosques

References

Notes

Citations

Sources

Further reading

 Campanini, Massimo, Mosque, in Muhammad in History, Thought, and Culture: An Encyclopedia of the Prophet of God (2 vols.), Edited by C. Fitzpatrick and A. Walker, Santa Barbara, ABC-CLIO, 2014.

External links
 
 Images of mosques from throughout the world, from the Aga Khan Documentation Center at MIT
 Devostock Public domain images, Images of mosques from around the world 

 
Islamic holy places
Building types
Islamic architecture
Mosque architecture